Vesna Trivalić (born 13 March 1965) is a Serbian actress.

Career
Trivalić studied at the Faculty of Dramatic Arts in Belgrade. Trivalić mainly plays supporting roles. She is known for her voice-work and has done numerous TV commercials, including commercials for JAT Airways.

Personal life
She got married in 2001, and hyphenated her surname with Pandurović. She has a son, Nikola.

Selected filmography

Film

Television

References

External links

Serbian film actresses
Actresses from Belgrade
1965 births
Living people
20th-century Serbian actresses
Serbian television actresses
Golden Arena winners